Abba River is a locality in Western Australia's South West region in the local government area of the City of Busselton. At the 2021 census, it had a population of 83. It was established as a bounded locality in 1987 and named after the nearby river with the same name.

References

South West (Western Australia)